Streltsov is a Russian masculine surname originating from the word strelets meaning shooter; its feminine counterpart is Streltsova. It may refer to

 Aleksandr Streltsov (born 1975), Soviet-born Swiss bobsledder
 Alexander Streltsov (born 1990), Russian ice hockey forward
 Andrei Streltsov (born 1984), Russian footballer
 Eduard Streltsov (1937–1990), Soviet footballer
Eduard Streltsov Stadium in Moscow, Russia
 Lev Streltsov (1918–1979), Ukrainian professor of law
 Olga Streltsova (born 1987), Russian track cyclist
 Valentin Streltsov, Ukrainian iconographer
 Valery Streltsov (born 1948), Belarusian association football manager
 Vasily Streltsov (born 1990), Russian professional ice hockey forward
 Vitali Streltsov (born 1982), Russian footballer
 Streltsov (film), a 2020 biographical sports drama film

Related
 Strelkov

References

Russian-language surnames